Heinrich Federer (6 October 1866 – 29 April 1928) was a Swiss writer and Catholic priest.

Biography 

Federer was born on 6 October 1866 in the Bernese village of Brienz. His father, Johann Paul Federer, was a wood carver and school teacher whose family came from Berneck, St. Gallen. He attended grammar school in Sarnen from 1881 until 1887, when he went to study at a college in Schwyz. After studying Catholic theology in Eichstätt, Lucerne, and Freiburg, he was ordained as a Catholic priest in 1893 and assigned as the chaplain in Jonschwil. He retired from the priesthood in 1899 after suffering from ill health. After an asthma diagnosis in 1900, he was transferred to a women's home in Zürich to recover. While there, he worked as the editor-in-chief of the Neue Zürcher Nachrichten, a Catholic newspaper. 

Federer had requested residence at Einsiedeln Abbey but was denied admission due to rumors of inappropriate sexual behavior. On 24 September 1902, Federer was accused of eliciting an abusive sexual relationship with a twelve year old pupil, Emil Brunner.

Federer wrote as a novelist, poet, and memoirist. Many of his books had religious themes, and countered the nationalistic Heimatkunst movement in Switzerland. In the 20th-century he was a best-selling author and awarded multiple literary accolades, including the Gottfried-Keller-Preis in 1925.

Federer died on 29 April 1928 and is buried in the Rehalp cemetery in Zürich. His literary works are preserved in the Swiss Literary Archives in Bern.

In 1966 Federer was honored with a Swiss federal stamp.

Bibliography 
Berge und Menschen, Roman, 1911
Lachweiler Geschichten, stories, 1911
Pilatus, narration, 1912
Sisto e Sesto, narration, 1913
Jungfer Therese, Roman, 1913
Das letzte Stündlein des Papstes, Narration, 1914
Das Mätteliseppi, Roman, 1916
Unser Herrgott und der Schweizer. Ein stolzbescheidenes Geschichtlein, 1916
Patria, narration, 1916
Eine Nacht in den Abruzzen. Mein Tarcisius-Geschichtlein, 1917
Gebt mir meine Wildnis wieder, narrative, 1918
Der Fürchtemacher, Narration, 1919
Das Wunder in Holzschuhen, stories, 1919
Spitzbube über Spitzbube, narrative, 1921
Papst und Kaiser im Dorf, narration, 1924
Wander- und Wundergeschichten aus dem Süden, stories, 1924
Regina Lob, Roman, 1925
Unter südlichen Sonnen und Menschen, six short stories, 1926
Am Fenster, autobiography, 1927
Aus jungen Tagen, autobiography, 1928
Von Heiligen, Räubern und von der Gerechtigkeit, 1929
Ich lösche das Licht, poems, 1930

References 

1866 births
1928 deaths
20th-century Swiss journalists
20th-century Swiss novelists
20th-century Swiss poets
Catholic Church sexual abuse scandals in Europe
Heinrich
People from Brienz
Roman Catholic writers
Swiss male novelists
Swiss male poets
Swiss male short story writers
Swiss newspaper editors
Swiss poets in German
19th-century Swiss Roman Catholic priests
Swiss writers in German